State Road 26 is an IB-class road in northern and central Serbia, connecting Belgrade with Bosnia and Herzegovina at Mali Zvornik. It is located in Belgrade and Šumadija and Western Serbia regions.

Before the new road categorization regulation given in 2013, the route wore the following names: M 19, M 14.1 and M 4 (before 2012) / 21 and 13 (after 2012).

The existing route is a main road with two traffic lanes. By the valid Space Plan of Republic of Serbia the road is not planned for upgrading to motorway, and is expected to be conditioned in its current state.

Sections

See also 
 Roads in Serbia

References

External links 
 Official website - Roads of Serbia (Putevi Srbije)
 Official website - Corridors of Serbia (Koridori Srbije) (Serbian)

State roads in Serbia